Asseria is the name of an ancient hillfort settlement located at Podgrađe, Benkovac around 30 kilometres east of Zadar in Croatia.

The hillfort has traces of human residence from prehistory to the late Roman period. In pre-Roman times Asseria was an important centre in south Liburnia for the Asseriates tribe. In the 1st century AD it became a Roman military post which then developed into a market centre. It is mentioned by Pliny the Elder as being exempted by Rome from the payment of tribute. It was probably granted municipium status under Claudius and enrolled in the tribus Claudia.

Parts of Asseria's city walls have survived, as well as a triumphal arch erected in 113 AD during the time of Trajan. The city walls are ashlar work, predating Roman occupation. Excavations have uncovered the 1st-century Roman forum, as well as a likely basilica. Finds from the excavations are at the Archaeological Museum in Zadar.

References

Illyrian Croatia
Roman fortifications in Croatia
Roman fortifications in Roman Dalmatia
Zadar County